Alligator II: The Mutation is a 1991 American monster horror film directed by Jon Hess and starring  Joseph Bologna, Woody Brown, Harlan Arnold, Nicolas Cowan, and Brock Peters. It is a sequel to the 1980 film, Alligator.

Synopsis
Deep in the sewers beneath the city of Regent Park, another baby alligator feeds on the experimental animals discarded by Future Chemicals Corporation. Nourished by toxic growth hormones and other mutating chemicals, the gator grows immensely, develops a voracious appetite and goes out on a killing spree. No one believes the sightings until a large number of people are killed, and the police eventually embark on a search-and-destroy mission to put a stop to the alligator's murderous rampage. They track it down to a lake and a police helicopter attempts to blow the alligator up. Two officers enter a marsh area, to where the alligator had escaped. One of the officers uses a rocket launcher and ends the alligator's reign of terror.

Plot
The film's plot has similar elements to the first one. Local tycoon Vincent Brown (Steve Railsback) dumps a tank full of chemicals from Future Chemicals into the sewers. The repeated dumping has mutated the baby alligator from the end of the original film to a massive size. Two Mexican fishermen are killed and local Detective David Hodges (Joseph Bologna), notorious for working alone, begins to investigate. While the fishermen's community suspects Brown, a severed leg leads Hodges's wife Chris, a local expert at the university, and  the coroner to identify the incident as an alligator attack. Brown has been planning a town party at the lake that Hodges tries to get Mayor Anderson to call off. The Mayor and local police chief refuse.

Rookie Police officer Rich Harmon is enlisted reluctantly by Hodges, but their attempt to kill the mutant alligator fails. Professional alligator hunter Shai Hawkins and his friends and brother are summoned by Brown. They begin their hunt almost simultaneously with Hodges, but fail, having underestimated the size of the creature. After losing his brother and two of his best friends, Hawkins joins Hodges and Harmon's team to hunt the alligator.

Hawkins and his team uncover proof that Brown dumped chemicals into the sewers. Brown has one of his men wreck Chief Speed's car, killing him, then before gathers people down to his lake area party. Hodges, Harmon, and Hawkins attempt to blow up the mutant alligator with a homemade bomb Hawkins and Hodges made, but the alligator damages the detonator by eating the bomb. The three pursue the alligator through the sewers after obtaining poison from Chris, while Chris and Harmon's girlfriend Sherri Anderson try to break up the lake party. Mayor Anderson turns on Brown, who murders him on the Ferris wheel. The alligator reaches the park before Hodges can stop it, ravaging Brown's party and killing the man who murdered Chief Speed. Brown has a gun, but throws him in the water, where he is devoured by the alligator. Hodges, Harmon, and Hawkins head out on the lake to cut it off, but their boat is overturned by the alligator who devours Hawkins. A helicopter picks up Harmon. Hodges stabs the alligator with the poison injector before being picked up himself. However, the alligator does not die.

Hodges and Harmon, armed with rocket launchers, track the creature to its nest in the sewers. Harmon's shot narrowly misses the alligator. Hodges manages to shoot it in a soft spot on its skull, blowing off the back of its head and detonating the bomb. On returning to the surface, they are greeted as heroes and Hodges acknowledges Harmon as his partner.

Cast
Joseph Bologna as Detective David Hodges
Dee Wallace as Christine Hodges
Richard Lynch as "Hawk" Hawkins
Woody Brown as Officer Rich Harmon
Holly Gagnier as Sheri Anderson
Bill Daily as Mayor Anderson
Steve Railsback as Vincent Brown
Brock Peters as Chief Clarence Speed
Trevor Eyster (credited as Tim Eyster) as J.J. Hodges
Vojislav Govedarica (credited as Voyo Goric) as Carmen, Brown's Bodyguard
Kane Hodder as Billy "Billy Boy" Hawkins
Carmen Filpi as Henry "Wino Henry"
Thomas Rosales Jr. as Victor
Professor Toru Tanaka as Joe "Tokyo Joe", The Wrestler
Alexi Smirnoff as "The Mad Russian", The Wrestler

Reception
The film, given only a very limited theatrical release, received generally negative reviews, with some critics considering it a retread of the first film. In a review of the original film, Kim Newman of Empire noted that "Alligator II: The Mutation is less a sequel than a lackluster remake". Almar Haflidason of BBC Online wrote that the film lacked "the wit and indeed the scares of the original".

References

External links

1991 films
1991 horror films
Films about crocodilians
Films based on urban legends
American sequel films
American monster movies
Giant monster films
1990s English-language films
1990s American films